Hank and Mike is a 2008 comedy film directed by Matthiew Klinck, from a screenplay written by Paolo Mancini and Thomas Michael. The film tells the story of two blue-collar Easter Bunnies who get fired and try their hand at an assortment of odd jobs.

The film premiered in 2008 at the NATPE NextGen Film Festival and was slated for general audience release on October 24, 2008 in the United States. The film was released in Canada on March 27, 2009.

Plot
Two blue-collar Easter Bunnies get fired and try their hand at an assortment of odd jobs, failing at each. Fighting depression, debt and eventually each other, their lives start to unravel until they realize that without their job they are nothing.

Cast

Production
The characters of the two Easter bunnies named Hank and Mike originally appeared in the TV series Y B Normal? Shooting began on February 1, 2007 in an abandoned Canadian Tire store in Toronto, Ontario.

Release
The film premiered in 2007 at the Vancouver International Film Festival and was slated for general audience release on October 24, 2008 in the United States. The film was released in Canada on March 27, 2009.

Festivals
 Karlovy Vary International Film Festival
 CineVegas
 Palm Beach International Film Festival
 Vancouver International Film Festival
 Victoria International Film Festival
 Seattle's True Independent Film Festival
 Hoboken International Film Festival
 Canadian Film Festival

References

External links

2008 films
2008 comedy films
Canadian comedy films
Easter Bunny in film
English-language Canadian films
Films shot in Toronto
2000s English-language films
2000s Canadian films